The Trubizh is a river entirely located in Ukraine, a left tributary of Dnieper. It falls into the Dnieper's Kaniv Reservoir (named after Kaniv).

Major cities: Pereiaslav.

References

Rivers of Kyiv Oblast